Coralliogalathea is a genus of squat lobsters in the family Galatheidae. Initially thought to be monotypic, solely represented by Coralliogalathea humilis, recent analysis has split the genus into six, morphologically similar but genetically different species.

List of Species
Corralliogalathea humilis Nobili, 1905
Corralliogalathea joae Rodríguez-Flores, et al., 2018
Corralliogalathea megalochira Nobili, 1906
Corralliogalathea minuta Rodríguez-Flores, et al., 2018
Corralliogalathea parva Rodríguez-Flores, et al., 2018
Corralliogalathea tridentirostris Miyake, 1953

References

Squat lobsters